The 1983 National Soccer League season was the sixth season under the National Soccer League (NSL) name. The season began in May, 1983 and concluded in early October 1983 with the NSL Championship final where Toronto Italia secured the title against Dinamo Latino in a penalty shootout. Toronto would also secure the double by defeating Toronto Panhellenic for the NSL Cup. Toronto Panhellenic achieved a milestone in league history as it won its first regular-season title.

Overview 
Before the commencement of the regular outdoor season, the National Soccer League (NSL) operated an indoor season for the winter months. When the regular season debuted the league faced competition from the newly formed Canadian Professional Soccer League (CPSL) as it became the country's first truly national professional soccer league. The CPSL had an NSL presence as both Hamilton Steelers and Toronto Croatia (operated as Mississauga Croatia) were participating members in the league while still retaining reserve teams in the NSL. The national experiment ended disappointingly as Inter-Montreal FC and Toronto Nationals departed from the league midway through the season, which forced an early postseason and ultimately collapsed after one season. On the other hand, the NSL strengthen its ties with the North American Soccer League (NASL) as the Toronto Blizzard and Toronto Italia secured a talent exchange deal. 

The membership in the league decreased to eight teams as the Bradford Marshlanders requested a sabbatical, and Toronto Falcons joined the Liga Hispanoamerica de Football Amateur (LHFA).

Teams

Final standings

Playoffs

Finals

Cup  
The cup tournament was a separate contest from the rest of the season, in which all eight teams took part. All the matches were separate from the regular season, and the teams were grouped into two separate divisions. The two winners in the group stage would advance to a two-legged match final for the Cup.

Finals

References

External links
RSSSF CNSL page
thecnsl.com - 1983 season

 
1983–84 domestic association football leagues
National Soccer League
1983